S. giganteus may refer to:
 Shantungosaurus giganteus, a flat headed hadrosaurid dinosaur species
 Spalax giganteus, the giant mole rat or Russian mole rat, a rodent species found in Kazakhstan
 Spirobranchus giganteus, the Christmas tree worm, a small tube-building polychaete worm species